The Trans-Java Toll Road is a tolled expressway network that runs from Port of Merak in Cilegon, the main link between the island of Sumatra and Java, to Banyuwangi, the eastern end of the island in Indonesia and the main link between the island of Java and Bali. It mainly runs through the northern coast of the island, except for the section between Semarang and Surabaya, where it runs through the centre and south of the island. It runs through five of the six provinces on the island of Java (DI Yogyakarta being the sole exception), connecting the major cities of Jakarta, Cirebon, Semarang, Solo, and Surabaya. The toll road is the land transportation backbone of the island and is the most important toll road network of the country.

The Trans-Jawa toll network was first conceived in whole in 1995, by President Soeharto as a means to connect both ends of the island to help with distribution and general traffic between the major cities that it runs through. But, the 1997 Asian financial crisis which affected the country, halted any developments. The project was later revived by President Joko Widodo, with the construction of the remaining sections starting between 2014 and 2016. This revival is mainly due to the main Pantura road getting increasingly congested, especially during the Eid and Christmas seasons.

Severel sections of the toll road were completed in December 2018, fully connecting the sections between Port of Merak and Surabaya. Meanwhile, the section connecting Surabaya and Probolinggo was completed a year later. As of 2022, The section between Probolinggo and Banyuwangi is yet to be completed, due to problems arising during constructions.

There are also many other complementary toll networks connecting this toll road. Trans-Java toll road is part of Asian Highway 2, which extends from Denpasar, Indonesia to Khosravi, Iran.

History 
During the Dutch colonial era, the colonial government ordered Governor-General Herman Willem Daendels to build a road connecting the two major ports of Anyer, part of modern-day Banten and Panarukan in modern-day Situbondo. 
Following the Indonesian independence. The road becomes the main route connecting the major cities of Jakarta, Semarang, and Surabaya, albeit with several deviations, instead of going through the old Preanger cities of Bogor, Cianjur, Bandung, Sumedang, before rejoining the coast in Cirebon, the new road instead follows the northern Java coast and is more commonly known as Pantura (Jalur Pantai Utara, literally meaning North Coast Road)
Over the years, this highway gets increasingly congested, the volume of cars using it increases each year, especially during Eid or Christmas seasons. The congestion is also caused by the fact that the highway is open-access, meaning that everyone, including pedestrians could use this road, not just intercity traffic. Frequent roadworks along the routes also hampers traffic.

In order to combat congestion, President Soeharto started commissioning toll roads along the corridor in the 1980s, following the construction of Indonesia's first toll road, the Jakarta-Bogor-Ciawi (Jagorawi) Toll Road. Soeharto also created a state-owned enterprise PT. Jasa Marga to regulate and operate toll roads in Indonesia.

During this era, the highway is completed in sections. The first section to be fully completed is the section between Tangerang and Jakarta, this section was completed in 1984. Two years later, the section between Surabaya and Gempol (near Pasuruan. Semarang Outer Ring Road was the next section to be fully opened (after having sections of it partially opened starting from 1983), opened in 1988. The next major section to be fully operational is the Jakarta-Cikampek section, spanning 72 km, this highway would become one of the most important and most used highway in Indonesia, as it is the fastest link between Jakarta and cities in eastern West Java, Central Java, and East Java. The Tangerang-Merak section is next to be completed, also spanning 72 km, this section was opened in 1992, fully connecting the Port of Merak with Jakarta, although links further east and south is not yet available through toll roads. Following the completion of the Tangerang-Merak section, construction along this network stagnated.

In 1995, Soeharto proposed the acceleration of constructions of several toll roads, including several along this network. But this instruction is quickly hampered by the 1997 Asian financial crisis, leading to a Presidential Instruction calling off a large number of constructions along the country. During this era, only two sections of the toll road is completed, namely parts of the Jakarta Outer Ring Road completed in 1995 and the Palimanan-Kanci section (bypassing Cirebon).

Following Reformasi, constructions of toll roads continue to stagnate, remarkably, no toll road in this corridor is completed during the first few years of Reformasi. During the presidency of Susilo Bambang Yudhoyono formed Badan Pengurus Jalan Tol (lit. Highway Operator Board). Following the formation of this board, highway construction, especially in this corridor continued, starting with the completion of several sections of the Jakarta Outer Ring Road and the 33 km Kanci-Pejagan section creating the first highway link between West Java and Central Java, several sections along the Surabaya-Mojokerto section was also completed during this period.

The government of Joko Widodo initiated the process to accelerate the construction of the remaining uncompleted sections of this network, starting with finishing the construction of the Cikampek-Palimanan section, started during Yudhoyono's presidency. This 116 km is regarded as the most important and long-awaited section along this network, as it finally connects Jakarta and Cirebon and onwards to Central and East Java, significantly cutting travel time between the regions, as it allows travellers to bypass one of the busiest sections between the region along the West Java coast.

Following the opening of the Cikampek-Palimanan section, Widodo instructed involved parties, particularly the Ministry of Public Works to accelerate the completion of the remaining sections in both Central Java and East Java. The remaining sections then simultaneously started construction in 2016, along with the finishing of partially completed sections and the construction of a new road on the Porong-Gempol section to replace the one washed out by the Lapindo floods.

After years of construction, this toll road network was finally completed and unveiled by President Joko Widodo on 20 December 2018, with the unveiling taking place on two locations, in Mojokerto and the Kalikuto Bridge, Batang (which became the icon for the new highway). Officially connecting Merak and Surabaya. While the section connecting Surabaya and Probolinggo was completed and unveiled the next year.

As of 2023, the only uncompleted portions of the Trans-Java Toll Road is the section between Probolinggo and Banyuwangi. The 170 km section, which would connect both Java coast, is currently under construction at a slow pace due to several problems, mainly problems arising from land ownership.

Main route

Tangerang–Merak Toll Road 
Although this road has been operating since 1981, it continues to lose money because the traffic is lower than expected. From 2005 to 2009, Astratel Nusantara (a subsidiary of Astra International) acquired the concession to build and manage this section of the toll road.

In January 2012, a  flood submerged the toll road at kilometer 58–59, making the road inaccessible to trucks, so the road was rerouted. Around 2,000 flood refugees occupied the shoulder of the toll road at that time.

Jakarta–Tangerang Toll Road 
By January 2011, the number of vehicles using this highway reached more than 250,000 per day. To ease congestion, the toll road was expanded to 3 lanes in each direction.

Jakarta Inner & Outer Ring roads 
Jakarta Inner Ring Road is connected directly with the Jakarta–Cikampek Toll Road at Cawang/Halim. At Tomang, a non-toll road connects the Inner Ring Road with Jakarta–Tangerang Toll Road. It is operated by Citra Marga Nusaphala Persada (IDX:CMNP), which controls 55% of the shares, and PT Jasa Marga (IDX:JSMR), which controls the remaining 45%. In 2010, PT CMNP received 93% of the company revenue from this toll road.

Jakarta Outer Ring Road (JORR) is connected with the Jakarta–Tangerang Toll Road at Kebon Jeruk and with Jakarta-Cikampek Toll Road at Cikunir. JORR is a 7-section toll road spanning .

The W1 section (JORR-W1) between Penjaringan and Kebon Jeruk is operated by PT Nusantara Infrastructure Tbk (IDX:META) while the rest is operated by PT Jasa Marga.

The concession for JORR-W2 is held by PT Marga Lingkar Jaya (MLJ) which is a joint-venture company. PT Marga Lingkar Jakarta owns 50% of PT MLJ and Jakarta Marga Jaya owns 35%. Sections 1, 2, and 3 of the JORR-W2, from Kebun Jeruk to Ciledug, were opened on December 27, 2013, while Section 4 was opened on July 21, 2014. With the completion of the W2 section, 53.24 kilometers of toll road between Rorotan and Penjaringan were fully connected. The toll road can hold about 100,000 vehicles per day and is expected to ease about 30% of the congestion on the Jakarta Inner Ring Toll Road.

The section between Koja and Tanjung Priok Port consists of 5 sub-sections and is predicted to be completed by mid-2015:
 Section E1, Rorotan–Cilincing,  (has been opened, no toll fee)
 Section E2, Cilincing–Jampea, 
 Section E2A, Cilincing–Simpang Jampea, 
 Section NS, Yos Sudarso–Simpang Jampea, 
 Section NS, Direct Ramp, 

To reduce traffic jams, trucks with a weight of 5 tonnes and above are not allowed to use the Cawang-Semanggi-Pluit segments from 05:00am to 10:00pm.

Jakarta Outer Ring Road 2 
Jakarta Outer Ring Road 2 Toll Road from Cengkareng to (access to) Tanjung Priok is 110.4 kilometers length, but until end of 2019 only 11,135 kilometers (Kunciran – Serpong) has been operated.

Jakarta–Cikampek Toll Road 

The Jakarta–Cikampek Toll Road is operated by Jasa Marga. The west part of the toll road, near Jakarta, consists of 4 lanes in one direction and 3 lanes in the other direction. This toll road is considered to be one of the most profitable in Java; it collected an average of 2 billion rupiahs (Rp) per day in tolls. The Jakarta-Cikampek Toll Road is heavily congested as it connects Jakarta and several of its satellite cities like Bekasi and Karawang. It also connects to the main routes to Bandung and the North Coast Road.

PT Lippo Cikarang Tbk (IDX:LPCK) and PT Kawasan Industri Jababeka Tbk (IDX:KIJA) constructed a new tollroad gate (Cibatu Gate) at km 34.700 with a 1.5 kilometer access road to their industrial complexes. The tollroad gate was officially opened on April 5, 2014.

There are also Jakarta–Cikampek Toll Road II Elevated from interchange Cikunir to West Karawang (Sta 9+500 till Sta 47+500) without any exit in between, because this toll road is planned for long trip drivers. PT Jasamarga Jalanlayang Cikampek has the concession and it has formally opened for small vehicles only on December 15, 2019, buses and trucks are not allowed to use it, so at the entrance gates there are portal for it.

Jakarta–Cikampek II South Toll Road 
Concession of the 62 kilometers Jakarta–Cikampek II South Toll Road has been got by PT Jasamarga Japek Selatan. The toll road connects Jakarta Outer Ring Road Toll and Purbaleunyi Toll Road at Jatiasih Gate and Sadang Gate. The other gates are Bantar Gebang, Setu, Sukaragam, Taman Mekar, and Kutanegara.
There are 3 Sections:
 Section 1: Jati Asih – Setu, 9.3 kilometers
 Section 2: Setu – Taman Mekar, 24.85 kilometers
 Section 3: Taman Mekar – Sadang, 27.85 kilometer.
In July 2019, 60 percent of land acquisitions have been done and initial constructions have been done also.

Cikampek–Palimanan Toll Road 
It runs through Cikopo, Kalijati, Subang, Cikedung, Kertajati, Sumberjaya and Palimanan. Total investment in the toll road reached Rp 12.8 trillion (US$1 billion) and the main investor is PT Lintas Marga Sedaya, a subsidiary of PT Surya Semesta Internusa Tbk (IDX:SSIA). Construction started on December 8, 2011, after eight national and international banks committed to provide funds for the project. The toll road was formally opened on June 13, 2015. It allows drivers to travel from Cikampek to Cirebon in 1.5 hours instead of 3.5 hours, and is projected to ease traffic on the North Coast Road by 50%.

On the first week when the road opened, 15 accidents occurred and 3 people were killed. By July 8, 2015 (three weeks after the toll road was opened), there were 56 accidents with 12 people killed. Most of the accidents were caused by driver errors such as sleep-deprived driving, speeding, and using the emergency lane at high speed.

Palimanan–Kanci Toll Road 
It is operated by Jasa Marga.

Kanci–Pejagan Toll Road 
The Kanci–Pejagan Toll Road was formally opened on January 26, 2010, and was operated originally by PT Bakrie Toll Road, a subsidiary of PT Bakrieland Development Tbk (IDX:ELTY), but in December, 2012, the shares were sold to PT Media Nusantara Citra (MNC) Group. At end of 2015, Waskita Karya has 99.99 percent shares of the toll road.

Pejagan–Pemalang Toll Road 
The concession for the road was held by PT Bakrie Toll Road, which is owned by Aburizal Bakrie, but in December, 2012, the shares were sold to MNC Group. On July 16, 2014, PT Waskita Toll Road, a subsidiary of PT Waskita Karya Tbk (IDX:WSKT), bought all shares of the toll road.

Construction on Sections I and II of the toll road began on July 23, 2014. On June 16, 2016, Section I & II of Pejagan-Pemalang Toll Road has been formally opened/operated.
On November 9, 2018, Section III & IV of Pejagan-Pemalang Toll Road has been formally opened/operated.

The toll road consists of 4 sections:
 Section I, Pejagan–West Brebes, 
 Section II, West Brebes–East Brebes, 
 Section III, East Brebes–East Tegal, 
 Section IV, East Tegal–Pemalang,

Pemalang–Batang Toll Road 
Construction of the Pemalang-Batang Toll Road has reached 97% in June 2017. On November 9, 2018, Section I of the toll road has been formally opened and operated.

Batang–Semarang Toll Road 
Initially the concession was owned by PT Bakrie Toll Road, but in December, 2012, the shares were sold to MNC Group. In April 2016, Jasamarga Semarang Batang which owned by Jasamarga 60 percent and Waskita Karya 40 percent got the concession for 45 years through government tender due to there are no progress of the toll road when it has been held by previous owners.

The toll road consists of five sections:
 Section-1: 3.2 km, in East Batang
 Section-2: 36.35 km, connecting East Batang and Weleri
 Section-3: 11.95 km, connecting Weleri and Kendal
 Section-4: 13.5 km, connecting Kendal and Kaliwungu
 Section-5: 10.9 km, connecting Kaliwungu and Krapyak

All the lands affected by the toll road were acquired in February 2017 and the toll road is predicted to be opened for the 2017 Eid Al-Fitr. The toll road is expected to be fully operational by 2018.

Semarang–Solo Toll Road 
It is operated by PT Trans Marga Jateng, a joint-venture company owned by PT Sarana Pembangunan Jawa Tengah (40%) and PT Jasa Marga (IDX:JSMR) Tbk (60%).

Section IV Salatiga-Boyolali is 24.50 kilometers and Section V Boyolali-Solo is 7.74 kilometers. Land acquisition of both sections are 98.8 percent when section III was formally operated.

Solo–Kertosono Toll Road 
Solo–Kertosono Toll Road (Soker) connects to Semarang-Solo Toll Road at its west end, and to Kertosono–Mojokerto Toll Road at its east end.

Soker Toll Road is divided into 4 sections, Solman I and Solman II in Central Java, and Manker I and Manker II in East Java Province. In July 2012, the land acquisition of the each section was about at 65%. Although the land acquisition is unfinished, construction of section 1 has begun. The sections of the Soker toll road are: 
Colomadu–Karanganyar Section:  of access road in Ngasem, Colomadu plus  of toll road with a total cost of Rp 1.8 trillion (government-support portion)
Karanganyar–Saradan Section:  with a total cost of Rp 5.57 trillion (investor portion)
Saradan–Kertosono Section:  with a total cost of Rp 1.7 trillion (government-support portion)

On March 29, 2018, a 52 kilometers toll road of Klitik-Wilangan has been inaugurated as a part of 87.5 kilometers of Ngawi-Kertosono Toll Road. On July 15, 2018, a 35.2 kilometers toll road of Kartosuro-Sragen has been inaugurated as a part of 176.7 kilometers of Solo-Kertosono Toll Road. On November 28, 2018, a 51.0 kilometers toll road of Sragen-Ngawi has been inaugurated.

Kertosono–Mojokerto Toll Road 
 Section 1 (Bandar–Jombang) – 
 Section 2 (Jombang–West Mojokerto) –
 Section 3 (West Mojokerto–North Mojokerto) – 
 Section 4 (connection with Ngawi-Kertosono Toll Road) – .

The concession is held by PT Marga Harjaya Infrastructure (MHI), whose majority owner (95%) is Astratel Nusantara (a subsidiary of Astra International). Maria Harjaya Infrastructure is funding the entire project without bank loans. The toll road was free for a month of trial operation, and on November 20, 2014, Section 1 was opened formally with a toll rate of Rp 10,000 for small vehicles. From the opening until the end of December 2014, only about 800 vehicles per day used Section 1, rather than the 11,000 vehicles per day that was predicted. MHI officials suggested that the toll road has not been used because it is too short and that the numbers will increase when the other sections open. Section 3 has been opened in December 2016, on September 10, 2017, Section 2 is formally opened. Section 4, which is only  will be opened together with Ngawi-Kertosono Toll Road.

Mojokerto–Surabaya Toll Road 
It connects with the Surabaya–Gempol Toll Road and the Waru-Juanda Toll Road. All sections of the toll road is already operated:
 Section IA, Waru-Sepanjang, open since August 2011.
 Section IB, Sepanjang-WRR , open since December 19, 2017.
 Section II, WRR-Driyorejo, open since December 19, 2017.
 Section III, Driyorejo-Krian, open since December 19, 2017.
 Section IV, Krian-Mojokerto, open since March 19, 2016.

Surabaya–Porong-Gempol Toll Road 
The road is open through Porong, but beyond that a 2-kilometer section of the old Porong Toll Road was damaged by the Lapindo Mudflow on May 29, 2006. To avoid this problem in the future, there is a plan for a new, Porong-Gempol Toll Road.

Gempol–Pasuruan Toll Road 
Concession of the toll road is 45 years belong to PT Trans Marga Jatim Pasuruan, a join venture between PT Jasa Marga (Persero) Tbk and PT Jatim Prasarana Utama with composition shares 98,81 percent and 1,19 percent respectively.

On March 31, 2017, Section IB from Bangil to Rembang has been opened. And on August 3, 2017, Section IIA from Gempol to Bangil has been opened. Section II from Rembang to Pasuruan has formally opened on June 22, 2018. Other toll roads that relieve congestion in this area are the Kejapanan-Gempol and Gempol-Pandaan Toll Roads which opened in May 2015.

Pasuruan–Probolinggo Toll Road 
The concession of Pasuruan–Probolinggo Toll Road was owned by PT Bakrie Toll Road, but in December 2012, the shares were sold to MNC Group. Now PT Waskita Tol Road (WTR) is the owner of this toll road. Section 1, 2 and 3 are formally opened on April 10, 2019.

The toll road consists of:
 Section-1: Grati–Nguling, 8 kilometers
 Section-2: Nguling–Sumberasih, 6 kilometers
 Section-3: Sumberasih–Leces, 16 kilometers
 Section-4: Leces–Gending, 14 kilometers

Probolinggo–Banyuwangi Toll Road 
Concession of the 172.91 kilometers Probolinggo–Banyuwangi Toll Road has been got by PT Jasa Marga, PT Waskita Toll Road and PT Brantas Abipraya (Persero). The segment of Situbondo–Banyuwangi will pass by the Ketapang Ferry Terminal, a harbor that connects Java and Bali. The Probolinggo-Banyuwangi Toll Road consists of three sections,
Section I: Probolinggo-Besuki (46.5 kilometers), 
Section II: Besuki-Asembagus (59.6 kilometers), and 
Section III: Asembagus-Ketapang (66.8 kilometers).

Complementary toll roads

Jagorawi Toll Road
The Jagorawi Toll Road was the first toll road in Indonesia. The Jagorawi Toll Road was built to connect Jakarta and Bandung via Puncak, but since the Purbaleunyi Toll Road opened, it is used primarily for tourists to travel to Puncak. There are plans to extend this toll road to reach Bandung so that there will be two ways to travel from Bandung, via Jakarta-Cikampek Toll Road and Purbaleunyi Toll Road, or using the Jagorawi Toll Road.

Cinere-Jagorawi Toll Road
Cinere-Jagorawi Toll Road or Cijago Toll Road is a 14.64 kilometers toll road which extends from Jagorawi Toll Road to Cinere. Section I from Cisalak to Jagorawi was inaugurated on January 27, 2012, which is 3.7 kilometers. Cinere – Cisalak section is expected to complete by the end of 2018. Metro and long distance and long or medium distances from Depok bus terminal will cross this toll road, without passing Lenteng Agung and Pasar Minggu. This toll road is part of the Jakarta Outer Ring Road 2.

Cinere-Serpong Toll Road
Cinere-Serpong Toll Road will connect the Kunciran-Serpong Toll Road in the west and the Cinere-Jagorawi Toll Road in the east. This toll road that connects South Tangerang with Depok. It is part of the Jakarta Outer Ring Road 2, which is expected to be completed in 2019. This toll road is divided into two sections. Section 1 is 6.67 kilometers from Serpong to Pamulang, while Section 2 is 3.64 kilometers from Pamulang to Cinere.

Cibitung–Cilincing Toll Road
The  Cibitung–Cilincing Toll Road will run between Cibitung and Cilincing. This is part of Jakarta Outer Ring Road 2. It will be composed of 4 sections:

 Section-1, Cibitung–SS Telaga Asih, 
 Section-2, SS Telaga Asih–SS Tembalang 
 Section-3, SS Tembalang–SS Tarumajaya, 
 Section-4, SS Tarumajaya–Cilincing, .

From Cibitung it will connect to the Jakarta–Cikampek Toll Road, and from Cilincing it will connect to Jakarta Inner Ring Road via the Koja-Tanjung Priok Port Toll Road. At Cimanggis Interchange, the toll road will be connected to the Jagorawi Toll Road and the Cinere-Jagorawi Toll Road which are currently under construction. The road concession is shared by three companies: MTD Capital Bhd (50%); PT Akses Pelabuhan Indonesia (45%); and PT Nusacipta Eka Pratama (5%). Construction is scheduled to begin in 2016 and the road to open in 2018.

Depok-Antasari Toll Road
Depok-Antasari Toll Road will connect South Jakarta with Depok and Bogor . This toll road extends from Jalan Pangeran Antasari of South Jakarta to Depok. The toll road will be extended to Bogor, precisely to Bogor Ring Road and Dramarga Toll Road – Bocimi. Depok-Antasari along 21.54 km consists of 5 sections of work, currently the development of physical construction has reached 60%.

Bogor-Ciawi–Sukabumi Toll Road
The full expansion project is to create a second toll route from Jakarta to Bandung. The initial concession for the road belonged to PT Bakrie Toll Road, but it was sold to MNC Group.

Purbaleunyi Toll Road
Purbaleunyi Toll Road is a combination of Cipularang Toll Road and Padaleunyi Toll Road. It runs from the north to south with the north end at Jakarta-Cikampek Toll Road and the south end at Cisumdawu Toll Road. Since it opened, this toll road has cut the time of car travel from Jakarta to Bandung to 2 hours.

Cisumdawu Toll Road
Cisumdawu Toll Road connects the cities of Cileunyi, Sumedang, and Dawuan. The toll road will connect Kertajati International Airport.

Surabaya-Gresik Toll Road
The Surabaya–Gresik Toll Road connects Surabaya with Gresik. Gresik is an important port for East Java, and it is the location of PT Semen Gresik (Gresik Cement). This toll road is operated by PT Margabumi Matraraya.

Surabaya–Tanjung Perak Toll Road
The Surabaya–Tanjung Perak Toll Road connects the city of Surabaya with its port at Tanjung Perak.

Mojosari- Krian-Legundi-Bunder-Manyar Toll Road 
Ngoro-Krian-Legundi-Bunder-Manyar Toll Road or abbreviated as KLBM Toll Road is a 38.39 kilometer toll road that connects the Krian area, Sidoarjo Regency and Manyar, Gresik Regency, East Java Province . This toll road is connected with the planned Tuban-Gresik Toll Road to the north and the Surabaya-Mojokerto Toll Road to the south. This toll road crosses the Sidoarjo and Gresik Regencies . KLBM Toll Road is a toll road that connects the main industrial areas in the main buffer areas of Surabaya, namely Sidoarjo and Gresik. This toll road is planned to start operating in 2019.

Waru–Juanda Toll Road
The Waru–Juanda Toll Road connects Surabaya with its airport (Juanda International Airport). This toll road is fully operated by Citra Margatama Surabaya, a subsidiary of Citra Marga Nusaphala Persada.

Juanda–Tanjung Perak Toll Road
The Juanda–Tanjung Perak Toll Road is also called the Surabaya Eastern Ring Road (SERR). It will connect Juanda International Airport with Tanjung Perak Port.

Pandaan-Malang Toll Road
The  Pandaan-Malang Toll Road is divided into five sections: Section 1 between Pandaan and Purwodadi, Section 2 ( between Purwodadi and Lawang, Section 3  between Lawang and Singosari, Section 4 ( between Singosari and Pakis, and Section 5 ( between Pakis and Malang. This toll road connects with Gempol-Pandaan Toll Road. On May 13, 2019, Sections 1, 2 and 3 have been formally opened, whereas Section 4 which is 87 percent completed, is opened for daytime travel only to accommodate travellers leaving for Eid Al-Fitr. The toll road has reduced traffic on arterial roads and national roads, which will facilitate transportation of goods to Malang and Batu, and has cut the travel time between Pandaan and Malang to less than an hour.

Solo–Yogyakarta-Kulonprogo Toll Road
The Solo–Yogyakarta-Kulonprogo Toll Road will connect the cities of Surakarta and Yogyakarta. The toll road runs from north to south with the north end connected to the Semarang-Solo Toll Road and the south end connected Yogyakarta-Magelang.

Semarang-Demak Toll Road
On September 23, 2019, a concession to PT Pembangunan Perumahan Semarang Demak signing has been done for building 27 kilometers Semarang Demak Toll Road. The toll road will be also functioned as embankment to avoid the sea water inundate the land. Predicted the project will be finished and functioned in 2022.

Impact
The completion of Trans-Java Toll Road connecting Jakarta and Surabaya in 2018 created a surge of intercity bus services in Indonesia. During this time, some intercity bus services began operating fleet of double decker busses.

Junctions and exits
Note: The distance is calculated west-east, while the exit numbers are calculated east-west

=Merak-Tangerang-Jakarta section

Exits

Merak-Tangerang-Jakarta section
Note: The distance is measured east-west, while the exit number is measured west-east

Jakarta Inner Ring Road (Tomang-Cawang segment)
Note: Distance is measured from the start of Merak-Jakarta section
More info: Jakarta Inner Ring Road

Jakarta-Semarang section
Note: Distance is measured from the start of Merak-Jakarta section, while exit number is measured from the start of this section

Semarang section
Note: Distance is measured from the start of Merak-Jakarta section, while exit number is measured from the start of this section

See also

 North Coast Road (Java)
 Trans-Sumatra Toll Road (Sumatra)

References

External links 
 Progress

Toll roads in Indonesia